Adelita or Adelitas may refer to:
 Adelita (turtle), the first sea turtle tracked across an ocean basin by satellite
 Adelita, the alias of Luisa Espina, a fictional revolutionary who plays a pivotal role in Mayans M.C.
 Adelita, a classical guitar piece by Spanish composer Francisco Tárrega
Adelitas, a synonym for Soldaderas, women in the military who participated in the conflict of the Mexican Revolution, after "La Adelita"
 Adelitas Way, a music group from Las Vegas, Nevada 
 "La Adelita", a corrido (folk song) of the Mexican Revolution (1910-1920)
 La Adelita, a 1973 black-and-white film by Gabriel Figueroa